Tshepang Dithole (born 10 March 1993) is a South African cricketer. He was included in the KZN Inland squad for the 2016 Africa T20 Cup. In June 2018, he was named in the Cricket South Africa Emerging Squad. In April 2021, he was named in KwaZulu-Natal Inland's squad, ahead of the 2021–22 cricket season in South Africa.

References

External links
 

1993 births
Living people
South African cricketers
Border cricketers
Gauteng cricketers
KwaZulu-Natal Inland cricketers
Cricketers from Johannesburg